Pselnophorus is a genus of moths in the plume moth family, Pterophoridae. They are native to the Northern Hemisphere and southern Africa. As of 2014 the genus contains eighteen species.

Species include:

Pselnophorus albitarsella (Walsingham, 1900)
Pselnophorus belfragei (Fish, 1881)
Pselnophorus brevispinus S.L.Hao & H.H.Li, 2008
Pselnophorus chihuahuaensis Matthews, Gielis, and Watkins, 2014
Pselnophorus ducis Gibeaux, 1994
Pselnophorus emeishanensis Arenberger, 2002
Pselnophorus heterodactyla (Müller, 1764)
Pselnophorus hodgesi Matthews, Gielis, and Watkins, 2014
Pselnophorus jaechi Arenberger, 1993
Pselnophorus japonicus Marumo, 1923
Pselnophorus kutisi Matthews, Gielis, and Watkins, 2014
Pselnophorus laudatus Bigot, 1964
Pselnophorus pachyceros Meyrick, 1921
Pselnophorus poggei (Mann, 1862)
Pselnophorus vilis (Butler, 1881)
Pselnophorus zulu Ustjuzhanin et Kovtunovich, 2010

References

Oidaematophorini
Taxa named by Hans Daniel Johan Wallengren